Diana Avdiu (born 11 June 1993 in Mitrovica, Kosovo) is a Kosovan model and beauty pageant titleholder who was crowned Miss Universe Kosovo 2012. She began her career as a model when she was 15 years old and has been featured on the covers of leading European fashion magazine Teuta as well as the last two years of runway presentations at New York Fashion Week.

Pageantry

Miss Universe 2012
Avdiu won the Miss Universe Kosovo competition on June 21, 2012, becoming the fifth representative of Kosovo at Miss Universe since its independence. This confirmed her place in the Miss Universe pageant held in December 2012 in Las Vegas. A pre-pageant favorite for the Miss Universe title, Avdiu won the Miss Photogenic Universe 2012 award for being the most photogenic contestant and became the fourth Miss Kosovo to enter the semifinals of the contest.  In 2013, she crowned both Antigona Sejdiu and Mirjeta Shala as Kosovo's representatives to the Miss World and Miss Universe pageants, respectively, following a split in the domestic organization.  She now resides in the United States where she works as model for Sherri Hill.

References

External links
Miss Universe Kosova 2012, Diana Avdiu
Miss Kosovo website

Kosovan beauty pageant winners
1993 births
Living people
Miss Universe 2012 contestants
People from Mitrovica, Kosovo
Kosovo Albanians
Albanian female models